The 1995 UEFA Super Cup was a two-legged match contested between the UEFA Cup Winners' Cup holders Real Zaragoza and the UEFA Champions League holders Ajax. The cup was played later than usual, the two legs taking place in February 1996. The first leg was drawn 1–1 at La Romareda in Zaragoza. The second leg was won 4–0 by Ajax at the Olympic Stadium in Amsterdam. Ajax won 5–1 on aggregate.

Match details

First leg

Second leg

See also
1994–95 UEFA Champions League
1994–95 UEFA Cup Winners' Cup
AFC Ajax in international football competitions

External links
1995 UEFA Super Cup at Rec.Sport.Soccer Statistics Foundation
First leg report and * *Second leg report at El Mundo Deportivo

Super Cup
1995
Uefa super
Super Cup 1995
Super Cup 1995
Super Cup 1995
Super Cup
Super Cup
UEFA Super Cup, 1995
February 1996 sports events in Europe
1990s in Amsterdam